is a Japanese competitor in synchronised swimming from Ōtsu, Shiga.

She received five Olympic medals at the 1996, the 2000 and the 2004 Summer Olympics. The silver medal from the 2000 Olympics was in the duet with Miho Takeda, and they also received a silver medal at the 2004 Olympics.

Tachibana began practicing the sport during her fourth year in elementary school. During the summer of 2008, she was a synchronized swimming coach for the Santa Clara Aquamaids in Santa Clara, California.

References

1974 births
Living people
Olympic silver medalists for Japan
Olympic bronze medalists for Japan
Japanese synchronized swimmers
Olympic synchronized swimmers of Japan
Synchronized swimmers at the 1996 Summer Olympics
Synchronized swimmers at the 2000 Summer Olympics
Synchronized swimmers at the 2004 Summer Olympics
People from Ōtsu, Shiga
Olympic medalists in synchronized swimming
Asian Games medalists in artistic swimming
Artistic swimmers at the 1994 Asian Games
Artistic swimmers at the 1998 Asian Games
Artistic swimmers at the 2002 Asian Games
World Aquatics Championships medalists in synchronised swimming
Synchronized swimmers at the 1998 World Aquatics Championships
Synchronized swimmers at the 1994 World Aquatics Championships
Medalists at the 2004 Summer Olympics
Medalists at the 2000 Summer Olympics
Medalists at the 1996 Summer Olympics
Asian Games gold medalists for Japan
Medalists at the 1994 Asian Games
Medalists at the 1998 Asian Games
Medalists at the 2002 Asian Games